Chaumuha Tehsil is a small tehsil in Mathura District of Uttar Pradesh. Chaumuha Tehsil Headquarters is Chaumuha town.  It belongs to Agra Division. Chaumhha Tehsil is located on National Highway 2 between Kosi Kalan & Mathura. It is 19 km from Mathura City.

References

Tehsils of Uttar Pradesh
Mathura district